Elitettan is the second highest division of Swedish women's football. Contested by 14 clubs, it operates on a system of promotion and relegation with Damallsvenskan and Division 1. Seasons run from April to October, with teams playing 26 matches each in the season. The league was created in 2013.

Current clubs (2022 season)

Promoted teams

References

External links
League at soccerway.com

 
2
Summer association football leagues
2013 establishments in Sweden
Sports leagues established in 2013
Professional sports leagues in Sweden